Courchevel is a commune in the department of Savoie, southeastern France. This city was established on January 1, 2017 by merging the two formerly distinct communes of Saint-Bon-Tarentaise (the seat) and La Perrière. It takes its name from the eponymous nearby ski resort of Courchevel.

Local culture and heritage

Heraldry

See also 
Communes of the Savoie department

References 

Communes of Savoie